The following is a list of churches in the Isle of Man.

The Island has an estimated 94 active churches for 84,497 inhabitants, a ratio of one church for every 899 people.

Several of the churches are Isle of Man registered buildings.

Active churches

Defunct churches

See also
Registered Buildings of the Isle of Man

References 

Isle of Man
Lists of religious buildings and structures in the Isle of Man